Conus tenuistriatus, common name the thin-line cone, is a species of sea snail, a marine gastropod mollusk in the family Conidae, the cone snails and their allies.

Like all species within the genus Conus, these snails are predatory and venomous. They are capable of "stinging" humans, therefore live ones should be handled carefully or not at all.

Description
The size of the shell varies between 22 mm and 68 mm. The shellis encircled throughout with fine striae, which are sometimes granular. Its color is violaceous or brown, with a few lighter spots on the spire, and usually a light irregular band below the middle of the body whorl. The aperture is violaceous. The shell has many of the characteristics of Conus glans Hwass in Bruguière, 1792

Distribution
This marine species occurs in the Indian Ocean (not Red Sea); from the Philippines and Indonesia to Papua New Guinea, off French Polynesia and the Marshall Islands; off Western Australia.

References

 Sowerby, G.B. (1st) 1834. Characters of new species of Mollusca and Conchifera collected by Mr Cuming. Proceedings of the Zoological Society of London 1834(2): 6-128
 Sowerby, G.B. II 1857–1858. Monograph of the genus Conus. 1-56, pls 1–24 in Thesaurus conchyliorum or monographs of genera of shells. London : Sowerby Vol. 3. 
 Dautzenberg, P. 1937. Gastéropodes marins. 3-Famille Conidae'; Résultats Scientifiques du Voyage aux Indes Orientales Néerlandaises de LL. AA. RR. Le Prince et la Princesse Lé Belgique. Mémoires du Musée Royal d'Histoire Naturelle de Belgique 2(18): 284 pp, 3 pls 
 Salvat, B. & Rives, C. 1975. Coquillages de Polynésie. Tahiti : Papéete Les editions du pacifique, pp. 1–391.
 Wilson, B. 1994. Australian Marine Shells. Prosobranch Gastropods. Kallaroo, WA : Odyssey Publishing Vol. 2 370 pp.
 Röckel, D., Korn, W. & Kohn, A.J. 1995. Manual of the Living Conidae. Volume 1: Indo-Pacific Region. Wiesbaden : Hemmen 517 pp. 
 Tucker J.K. & Tenorio M.J. (2013) Illustrated catalog of the living cone shells. 517 pp. Wellington, Florida: MdM Publishing.

External links
 The Conus Biodiversity website
 Cone Shells - Knights of the Sea
 

tenuistriatus
Gastropods described in 1858